Ali Bouafia (born 5 August 1964) is a retired footballer. Born in Mulhouse, France, Bouafia spent his entire club career playing with various clubs in that country. At international level he represented Algeria, and was a member of the squad at the 1992 African Cup of Nations in Senegal.

External links
 
 weltfussball 
 Profile

1964 births
Living people
French footballers
Algerian footballers
Algeria international footballers
1988 African Cup of Nations players
1992 African Cup of Nations players
French sportspeople of Algerian descent
FC Mulhouse players
Olympique de Marseille players
Olympique Lyonnais players
RC Strasbourg Alsace players
FC Sochaux-Montbéliard players
FC Lorient players
US Créteil-Lusitanos players
En Avant Guingamp players
Ligue 1 players
Ligue 2 players
Footballers from Mulhouse
Association football midfielders